Robert Marilla Scott (March 30, 1943 – August 4, 2021) was an American football running back for the Cleveland Browns in the National Football League.

Biography
Scott played at the collegiate level for Ohio State University and was selected by the Browns in the third round of the 1965 NFL Draft. Because the Browns' backfield was already full of quality backs, such as future Hall of Fame rushers Jim Brown and Leroy Kelly, as well as Ernie Green, 

Scott elected to sign for the Ottawa Rough Riders of the Canadian Football League. In Canada, he was named a CFL all-star and helped the team to the 1968 Grey Cup championship. After joining the Browns in 1969, Scott rushed for 2,124 yards and 18 touchdowns in 554 attempts in his Cleveland career. 

Scott was the starting fullback for the Browns from 1970-1972. After his playing time diminished in 1973 and 1974, Scott was waived by Cleveland on August 8, 1975.

Death
He died on August 4, 2021, in Columbus, Ohio, at the age of seventy-eight.

References

1943 births
2021 deaths
American football running backs
Canadian football running backs
Cleveland Browns players
Ohio State Buckeyes football players
Ottawa Rough Riders players
People from Connellsville, Pennsylvania
Players of American football from Pennsylvania
Sportspeople from the Pittsburgh metropolitan area